Egypt competed at the 2019 African Games held from 19 to 31 August 2019 in Rabat, Morocco. In total 297 athletes were expected to represent Egypt at the games. This later increased to 330 athletes. Athletes representing the country won 102 gold medals, 98 silver medals and 73 bronze medals and the country finished 1st in the medal table.

Medal summary

Medal table 

|  style="text-align:left; width:78%; vertical-align:top;"|

|  style="text-align:left; width:22%; vertical-align:top;"|

3x3 basketball 

The Egyptian men's team won the silver medal in the 3x3 basketball at the 2019 African Games, losing to Madagascar in the final. They were represented by Basem Alian Serageldin Elsayed Mohamed Mohamed and Kareem Moussa.

The women's team did not make it out of the preliminary round.

Archery 

Egypt successfully competed in archery at the 2019 African games, winning 4 gold and 2 bronze medals.

Athletics 

Egypt competed in athletics.

Badminton 

Egypt competed in badminton with 8 players (4 men and 4 women).

In total badminton players representing Egypt won one gold medal, one silver medal and four bronze medals.

Boxing 

In total boxers representing Egypt won two gold medals and two bronze medals. The country finished in 4th place in the boxing medal table.

Equestrian 

Egypt competed in equestrian events. Athletes representing Egypt won the silver medal in the team jumping event.

Fencing 

Egypt competed in fencing. In total athletes representing Egypt in fencing won eight gold medals, five silver medals and six bronze medals.

Handball 

Egypt competed in the men's tournament and the team won the silver medal.

Judo 

Mohamed Abdelmawgoud, Nouran Adam and Lamiaa Alzenan were among the athletes to represent Egypt in judo.

Karate 

Egypt competed in karate. Giana Farouk, Feryal Abdelaziz and Menna Shaaban Okila were among the athletes to compete. In total athletes representing Egypt in karate won two gold medals, eight silver medals and four bronze medals and the country finished in 2nd place in the karate medal table.

Rowing 

In total, rowers representing Egypt won one gold medal, five silver medals and three bronze medals.

Shooting 

Egypt competed in shooting. In total sport shooters representing Egypt won three gold medals, one silver medal and two bronze medals.

Snooker 

On 20 August, Gantan Elaskary beat fellow Egyptian . Later that same day, Sharafeldin would lose to against Morocco's Youssra Matine 2-1. Elaskary would go on to earn the country a silver medal.

Abdelrahman Abdelhamid and Mohamed Alakrady are scheduled to compete for the men.

Swimming 

Swimmers representing Egypt won 14 gold medals, 17 silver medals and 10 bronze medals and the country finished in 2nd place in the swimming medal table.

Table tennis 

Omar Assar and Dina Meshref, both three-time champions and represented Egypt at the 2012 Summer Olympics represented their country again. Assar leads the continental rankings for men's table tennis while Meshref leads for the women.

Assar won a bronze medal in the men's singles event and he also won the gold medal in the men's team event together with Ahmed Saleh and Khalid Assar. Saleh and Mohamed Elbeialy won the silver medal in the men's doubles event.

Taekwondo 

In total, athletes representing Egypt in Taekwondo won two gold medals, eight silver medals and one bronze medal and the country finished in 3rd place in the Taekwondo medal table.

Tennis 

Mohamed Safwat won the gold medal in the men's singles event and Karim-Mohamed Maamoun won the silver medal in that event.

Mayar Sherif won the gold medal in the women's singles event. Both Lamis Alhussein Abdel Aziz and Sandra Samir won the bronze medals in the same event.

In the men's doubles even two teams won the bronze medals: Akram El Sallaly and Mohamed Safwat as well as Karim-Mohamed Maamoun and Sherif Sabry.

Triathlon 

Basmla ElSalamoney, Rehab Hussein, Mohamed Khalil and Mohamed Shehata competed in triathlon.

ElSalamoney won the gold medal in the women's event. The country also won the bronze medal in the mixed relay event.

Volleyball 

On 5 June, Egypt's men team qualified for the African Games after winning a match against Kenya. The men's team has previously won the in five separate games prior and is expected to perform well again in 2019.

On 20 August, Egypt's Beach volleyball women's team (Farida Elaskalany and Doaa Elghobashy) beat Kenya in the finals to win the country its fifth gold medal.

Weightlifting 

Egypt is in contention for the gold medal along with Tunisia and Nigeria. Mohamed Ihab, 2016 olympic bronze medalist and the countries most decorated, will be trying to earn a top spot in preparation for the 2020 Tokyo Olympic Games.

Wrestling 

Wrestlers representing Egypt won five gold medals, four silver medals and seven bronze medals and the country finished in 2nd place in the wrestling medal table.

References 

Nations at the 2019 African Games
2019
African Games